The Bonnechere River is a river in the Saint Lawrence River drainage basin in Nipissing District and Renfrew County in eastern and northeastern Ontario, Canada. The river flows from Algonquin Provincial Park to the Ottawa River east and north of the town of Renfrew. The river's name is thought to come from the French "bonne chère" meaning "good cheer".

Geography

The Bonnechere River begins in Algonquin Provincial Park at McKaskill Lake in geographic Clancy Township in the Unorganized South Part of Nipissing District. It heads north into geographic Niven Township, then loops back southeast into Clancy Township, under a Hydro One transmission corridor and into geographic Guthrie Township. It continues southeast through the Crooked Chute, over the High Falls, through the Stacks Rapids to the unincorporated place Basin Depot, located on a former logging road.

The river continues southeast out of the park at Boundary access point (Access point Q), enters geographic Burns Township in Madawaska Valley, Renfrew County, then heads into geographic Richards Township in Killaloe, Hagarty and Richards, Renfrew County, takes in the left tributary Pine River, passes through the Jack Chute Rapids, and reaches Round Lake, where it takes in the right tributary Sherwood River. The rivers leaves the lake at Grassy Bay controlled by the Round Lake Dam and reaches Golden Lake in North Algona Wilberforce, where it is crossed by Ontario Highway 60. The lake is home to Killaloe at the west and the Algonquins of Pikwàkanagàn First Nation at the southeast.

From Golden Lake until the river reaches Admaston/Bromley downstream, the river forms the boundary between North Algona Wilberforce (left bank, on the north) and Bonnechere Valley (right bank, on the south). The Bonnechere River leaves Golden Lake controlled by the Golden Lake Dam.

The river reaches its mouth at Lac des Chats on the Ottawa River near the settlement of Fergusons Beach.

The Chutes
There are five chutes along the Bonnechere River. The First Chute of the river is where the Bonnechere empties into the Ottawa River, at Castleford. The Second Chute is in Renfrew; this waterfall has a small hydroelectric dam. The Third Chute is in Douglas, which also has a small hydroelectric dam. The Fourth Chute is in the small village of Fourth Chute, and the Fifth Chute is in Eganville. The chutes used were for moving timber past rapids and waterfalls.

Tributaries

Golden Lake
Scharfe Creek (left)
Eadys Creek (left)
Beaudrys Creek (left)
Browns Creek (left)
Sauers Creek (left)
Cochrane Creek (left)
Brennans Creek (right)
Round Lake
Turners Creek (left)
Reserve Creek (left)
Jacks Creek (left)
Sherwood River (right)
Byers Creek (right)
Pine River (left)
Robitaille Creek (right)
Dupuis Creek (left)
Hogan Creek (right)
Jenkins Creek (left)
Batise Creek (left)
Gross Creek (left)
McGuire Creek (right)
North Bonnechere River (left)
Fairy Creek (left)

Economy
During the 19th century, the river was used to transport white pine logs from the forested areas surrounding the river. A number of hydroelectric plants have been built on the river.

Natural history

The Bonnechère Caves, formed from ancient limestone, are located by the river near the village of Eganville, Ontario, in the hamlet of Fourth Chute, Ontario.

There are two provincial parks along its length: the Bonnechere River Provincial Park (a 23 km long section bordering Algonquin Park) and the Bonnechere Provincial Park (located on Round Lake).

The Bonnechere River lies mostly in a 175 million year old rift valley called the Ottawa-Bonnechere Graben.

Over the years, songs have been written about the Bonnechere River including the recent "In The Arms Of The Bonnechere River" by Ottawa Valley singer/songwriter, Terry McLeish.

River run 
Each year the river is host to a raft run between the third and fourth chute. Originally arranged by local Shriners the run has taken on a less official status, occurring with little to no organization apart from its pre-determined date during Victoria Day weekend. Participants design and build a raft or anything else they hope will take them down the river. The river presents natural obstacles in the form of light rapids. There is no competitive angle to the run with no prize at the end other than warmth and a good time. Most participants are young adults from the area returning to visit friends and family. Having recently surpassed its twenty-fourth year, the river run is a local tradition.

See also
 Madawaska River (Ontario) - nearby river with similar characteristics

References

Sources

External links

Rivers of Renfrew County
Rivers of Nipissing District